Syntomodrillia carolinae is a species of sea snail, a marine gastropod mollusk in the family Drilliidae.

Description
The length of the shell varies between 6 mm and 10 mm.

Distribution
This marine species occurs in the Caribbean Sea, of the Antilles (Guadeloupe) and Southern Brasil at depths between 219 m and 293 m.

References

 P. Bartsch (1934), New Mollusks of the Family Turritidae:(with Eight Plates); Smithsonian Institution

External links
  Tucker, J.K. 2004 Catalog of recent and fossil turrids (Mollusca: Gastropoda). Zootaxa 682:1–1295.
 Fallon P.J. (2016). Taxonomic review of tropical western Atlantic shallow water Drilliidae (Mollusca: Gastropoda: Conoidea) including descriptions of 100 new species. Zootaxa. 4090(1): 1–363
 Specimen at MNHN, Paris

carolinae
Gastropods described in 1934